The Gemec State Forest Railway is a 760 mm gauge railway in Hungary. It runs for 32 km within the Danube-Drava National Park.

Railway lines in Hungary